Love Runs Blind, often abbreviated as LRB, was a Bangladeshi rock band formed in Chittagong City by Ayub Bachchu from 5 April 1991 until 18 October 2018. They are one of the most successful bands of Bangladesh. Since their formation, they have released thirteen studio albums, one live album and two compilation albums. They have also appeared in several mixed albums. They are considered to be among the pioneers of Bangladeshi hard rock music. They were originally formed as a hard rock band, but have experimented with many subgenres of rock and roll.

After signing with Sargam Records, LRB released the first double album in Bangladesh, LRB I and LRB II in 1992. Their 3rd album "সুখ (Happiness)" (1993) helped them to get more commercial success in the country, and featured the song "চলো বদলে যাই (Let's Change)", which is one of the most popular rock songs in Bangladesh. Their popularity continued with hit albums like "তবুও (Yet)" (1994), "ঘুমন্ত শহরে (In the Sleeping City)" (1995) etc. In September 1996, they released "Ferari Mon: Unplugged Live", which was the first live album in Bangladesh. They are the only Bangladeshi band to perform in the Madison Square Garden, New York. They rose to mainstream fame in the early 1990s and is part of "Big Three of Rock" along with Ark and Nagar Baul, who were responsible for popularizing hard rock music in Bangladesh in the 1990s. In 18 October 2018, lead singer and lead guitarist of the band Ayub Bachchu, died of cardiac failure in his own residence. Bachchu gave his last performance in Rangpur, Bangladesh, two days before his death.

LRB is considered to be one of the most influential and successful rock bands of Bangladesh. The Top Tens ranked them number 4 on their list of "Top 10 Rock Bands of Bangladesh". They have won a record six Meril Prothom Alo Awards and a Citycell-Channel I Music Award in 2007.

History

Early Years, L.R.B. I and L.R.B. II (1990–1992) 

In the late 1990, Ayub Bachchu got out of Souls. Bachchu along with S.I. Tutul, Saidul Hasan Swapan, Habib Anwar Joy formed the band LRB, which stood for Little River Band. But, after Bachchu found out that an Australian rock band had the same name, he changed it to Love Runs Blind. Their first line up included Bachchu on vocals and guitars, S.I. Tutul on keyboards, Swapan on bass, Joy on drums. LRB were invited to perform in a concert in University of Dhaka arranged by BAMBA on 26 April 1991 along with other rock bands like Souls, Feelings, Ark and many other bands.

In their early days they used to play live shows in Hotel Sheraton and Chambeeli Super Club along with bands like Ark and Feedback. In early 1991, they signed a deal with Sargam and went on to record their albums LRB I and LRB II, which was the first double album in Bangladesh. The album was released in Cassette format. It included one of the greatest hit songs of LRB "ঘুম ভাঙ্গা শহরে (In the Woke Up City)" which was the first released song of LRB as a band and this song was a super hit overnight all over Bangladesh, "ঘুম ভাঙ্গা শহরে (In the Woke Up City)"  was also the first rock song of Bangladesh and the song was written by legendary lyricist Shahid Mahmud Jangi. The albums  also include songs like "ঢাকার সন্ধ্যা (Evening of Dhaka)", "হকার (Hawker)", "মা (Mother)" and "এক কাপ চা (A Cup of Tea)".

"সুখ (Happiness)" and "তবুও (Yet)" (1993–1994) 
After the release of their double albums, they signed a new contract with Soundtek in the mid 1992 and quickly started to work on their third album সুখ (Happiness). The album came out in 1993. It was the band's first album to get commercial success. With the power ballad "চলো বদলে যাই (Let’s Change)" becoming the most popular rock song of the year, they became one of the best bands of that era. The song became their signature song. The album also included hard rock song "গতকাল রাতে (Last Night)", "রুপালী গিটার (Silver Guitar)". After the release of সুখ (Happiness), drummer Habib Anwar Joy left the band for Ark. On 8 June 1993, Milton Akbar joined the band as their drummer. In 1994, they released their fourth studio album তবুও (Yet) from Sargam Records. It included the hit song "রাত জাগা পাখি (Night Bird)". Though the album was not as successful like the previous album, it cemented their hard rock status. In January 1994, drummer Milton Akbar left the band and was replaced by Riyad on 31 January 1994.

Death of Ayub Bachchu and tribute concert (2018–present) 

In 2012, Ayub Bachchu was admitted to the CCU Hospital in Dhaka for the accretion of water in his lungs. He recovered after receiving treatment. On 18 October 2018, he died from cardiac failure at his own residence. He was declared dead at Square Hospital at 9:55 a.m. He was laid to rest in Chittagong City beside his mother's grave.

After his death his bandmates and other musicians in the country held a concert named "Tribute to Ayub Bachchu" which was produced by BAMBA, where many bands performed songs of LRB. A tribute concert in Kolkata was held on 24 November 2018, title "আইয়ুব বাচ্চুর স্মরণে দুই বাংলার রকবাজি (In Memoriam of Ayub Bachchu, the Rocking of Two Bangla)" where many Indian artists performed songs of LRB.

The remaining members of the band, along with his [Bachchu] son Ahnaf, performed in the whole country. They started another tour from 22 January 2019, with Golam ur Rahman Romel on vocals and drums, Abdullah al Masud on guitars and Saidul Hasan Swapan on bass. The first show was held at "Hotel the Palace" in Sylhet.

On 7 April 2019, during an event at Cafe Thirty-three, under the tagline "The Legacy Continues", the group announced Balam Jahangir as their new lead singer. Bachchu's wife and daughter was not satisfied with the members of the band performing with a new singer under the name LRB. They asked the members to change the name. The band was disbanded for few days and the other members of the band along with Balam formed a new band named, "Balam and the Legacy". Bangladesh Copyright Office said that: "Bachchu is the sole owner of LRB, only his heirs can run the band with the same name." On 15 April 2019, Bachchu's son Ahnaf Tazwar Ayub posted in his Facebook account that he was "okay" with the other members of the band keeping the name, and later Bachchu's wife and daughter also agreed on it.

Musical style 

LRB is a hard rock band, whose music has often been described as blues rock, soft rock, psychedelic rock. The band has been cited as one of the pioneering heavy metal band in Bangladesh. Early on LRB were influenced by the Jimi Hendrix Experience, Deep Purple, Led Zeppelin and Dire Straits. Ayub Bachchu stated in an interview that Jimi Hendrix and Joe Satriani were his main influences. On the back sleeve of their album, LRB II, Bachchu said that:

The 1990s albums of LRB were mostly hard rock, pop rock and blues rock. But, from their 2007 studio album "স্পর্শ (Touch)" they have released many heavy metal tracks. Since, Abdullah al Masud joined in 2003, LRB was making more heavier sound as there were two guitarist. Their last two studio albums, "যুদ্ধ (War)" (2012) and "রাখে আল্লাহ মারে কে (Allah Keeps, Who Kills)" (2016) mostly consisted heavy metal numbers.

Tours 

LRB has performed over 1,000 gigs that have included extensive performances in Bangladesh as well as tours in Asia, Europe, and the United States. Their first show outside country was held in India in 1997 at Jadavpur University, where LRB was to perform. But the organisers were a little bit doubtful about the quality of the band. After their performance they request LRB to act as a judge which Ayub Bachchu agreed to comply with. In 1998, LRB went for their first international tour in United States, where they played in seven states. In 1998, the group also played in Qatar, Abu Dhabi, Japan, Germany, Vienna, Austria, and Italy. The group played a second tour in the United States in 2000. The group had a European tour in 2002, which included Austria, United Kingdom, and Australia.

From 2003 through 2006, LRB performed twice in Italy and Belgium. They also performed in many cities in India as well as Germany, Singapore, Hong Kong, and Wembley Arena in London. At Singapore they performed at Fort Canyon Park stage. In 2005 and 2006, LRB performed in Salt Lake Stadium, Science City Theater, Alpha Bangla, ETV Bangla, Najrul Manch, Rabindra Shorobor, Guru Nanak University (Jodhpur), Haldia Utshab, Durgapur University,  Kalyani, Govt Engineer College in the fest "EXOTICA '08", and recently at NRS Medical College and Hospital, Kolkata in their college fest "ECSTASY 2013". LRB has performed in Wimbledon Stadium in London, Madison Square Garden in New York City twice, and Ellin Garden in the United Kingdom.

LRB also has used its music to support social causes in conjunction with other Bengali rock groups. Recently, they performed in support of children endangered by the recent Tsunami and Sidr. Also, they have performed in support of campaigns to "Say No to Drugs", "Save Motherhood", and "Victims Against Non-violence". In 1998 Ayub bachchu released a solo album "বাঁচাও বিধাতা (Save Me God)"  for the aid of the flood-stricken people of the country.

Discography 

Studio albums
 L.R.B I (1992) 
 L.R.B II (1992) 
 "সুখ (Happiness)" (1993) 
 "তবুও (Yet)" (1994) 
 "ঘুমন্ত শহরে (In the Sleeping City)" (1995) 
 "স্বপ্ন (Dream)" (1996) 
 "ফেরারী মন: Unplugged Live" (1996)
 "আমাদের? (Ours?)" (1998) 
 "বিস্ময় (Wonder)" (1998) 
 "মন চাইলে মন পাবে (If You Want My Heart, You'll Get it)" (2001) 
 "অচেনা জীবন (Unknown Life)" (2003) 
 "মনে আছে নাকি নাই (Do You Remember, or Not)" (2005) 
 "স্পর্শ (Touch)" (2008) 
 "যুদ্ধ (War)" (2012) 
 "রাখে আল্লাহ মারে কে (Allah Keeps, Who Kills)" (2016)

Awards 

Meril Prothom Alo Awards

|-
| 1998 || Love Runs Blind  || Best Band of the Year || 
|-
| 1999 || Love Runs Blind || Best Band of the Year || 
|-
| 2000 || Love Runs Blind  || Best Band of the Year || 
|-
| 2001 || মন চাইলে মন পাবে (If You Want My Heart, You'll Get it) || Best Band Album of the Year || 
|-
| 2005 || Love Runs Blind  || Best Band of the Year || 
|-
| 2007 || স্পর্শ (Touch) || Best Band Album of the Year || 
|-
| 2009 || Bolini Tomai || Best Male Vocal of the Year || 

Citycell-Channel I Music Awards

|-
| 2007 || স্পর্শ (Touch) || Album of the Year ||

Members 

All members

 Ayub Bachchu (died 2018) — front-man, band leader, lead guitars, lead vocals  
 Shahidul Islam Tutul — keyboards 
 Habib Anwar Joy — drums 
 Saidul Hasan Swapan — bass guitar 
 Milton Akbar — drums 
 Sumon — drums 
 Riaydh Sarwar - drums 
 Abdullah al Masud — guitars, vocals 
 Golam ur Rahman Romel — drums 
 Arif Shishir — drums 
 Kazi Md. Ali Jahangir Balam - lead vocal

See also 
 Rock music of Bangladesh
 Love Runs Blind discography

References

External links 

 Official Website [archived]
 Official Website of AB Kitchen
 Official Facebook Page
 BBC Music
 LRB (Love Runs Blind) Band's Details with Lyrics

Bangladeshi rock music groups
Musical groups established in 1991
Musical groups disestablished in 2020
1991 establishments in Bangladesh
2020 disestablishments in Bangladesh
Musical groups from Chittagong